HMS Tilbury was a 50-gun fourth rate ship of the line of the Royal Navy, launched at Chatham Dockyard on 3 September 1699.

Tilbury served until 1726, when she was broken up.

Notes

References

Lavery, Brian (2003) The Ship of the Line - Volume 1: The development of the battlefleet 1650-1850. Conway Maritime Press. .

Ships of the line of the Royal Navy
1690s ships